Benilde or the Virgin Mother (Benilde ou a Virgem Mãe) is a 1975 Portuguese drama film based on the play by José Régio and directed by Manoel de Oliveira.

Plot
Raised in seclusion, a young woman claims her unborn child was conceived through an angel.

Cast
 Maria Amélia Matta as Benilde
 Jorge Rolla as Eduardo, Benilde's cousin
 Varela Silva as Melo Cantos, Benilde's father
 Glória de Matos as Etelvina, Eduardo's mother
 Maria Barroso as Genoveva, the house-keeper
 Augusto De Figueiredo as Cristóvão, the priest
 Jacinto Ramos as Fabrício, the doctor

References

External links
 

1975 films
1975 drama films
Films directed by Manoel de Oliveira
Films produced by Paulo Branco
Portuguese drama films
1970s Portuguese-language films